Winston Miller (June 22, 1910 – June 21, 1994) was an American screenwriter, film producer, and actor. He wrote for more than 60 films and television shows between 1936 and 1976. He began as an actor in silent films, appearing in eleven films between 1922 and 1929. He was the screenwriter for many TV series including Wagon Train Episode 13, Season 1 in 1957: "The Clara Beauchamp Story" with Nina Foch and Shepperd Strudwick. Earl Bellamy was the director.

He was born in St. Louis, Missouri, the younger brother of silent film star Patsy Ruth Miller. He died in Los Angeles from a heart attack.

Selected filmography

 The Love Piker (1923)
 The Light That Failed (1923)
 Kentucky Pride (1925)
 Stella Dallas (1925)
 The Vigilantes Are Coming (1936)
 Dick Tracy (1937)
 The Painted Stallion (1938)
 The Royal Mounted Patrol (1941)
 Man from Cheyenne (1942)
 S.O.S. Coast Guard (1942)
 Good Morning, Judge (1943)
 Home in Indiana (1944)
 One Body Too Many (1944)
 Follow That Woman (1945)
 They Made Me a Killer (1946)
 My Darling Clementine (1946)
 Hong Kong (1951)
 Lucy Gallant (1955)
 April Love (1957)

External links

1910 births
1994 deaths
20th-century American male actors
20th-century American businesspeople
American male screenwriters
Film producers from Missouri
American male film actors
American male silent film actors
Male actors from St. Louis
Screenwriters from Missouri
20th-century American male writers
20th-century American screenwriters